Fibulomyces is a genus of fungi belonging to the family Atheliaceae.

The genus has cosmopolitan distribution.

Species:

Fibulomyces canadensis 
Fibulomyces cystoideus 
Fibulomyces fusoideus 
Fibulomyces mutabilis

References

Atheliales
Atheliales genera